St. Thomas' Church, Whitemarsh is an Episcopal church located at the juncture of Bethlehem Pike, Skippack Pike, and Church Road in Whitemarsh Township, Montgomery County, Pennsylvania.  The church is part of the Episcopal Diocese of Pennsylvania.

History

One of the oldest Episcopal churches in the United States, St. Thomas' Church was founded in 1698. The Pennsylvania guide, compiled by the Writers' Program of the Works Progress Administration in 1940, described St. Thomas' Church as a "simple, dignified, red stone edifice in English Gothic style," noting that

Notable burials
Francis Beverly Biddle (1886-1968) - Attorney General of the United States during World War II
Joseph Sill Clark, Jr. (1901-1990) - U.S. Senator from Pennsylvania and Mayor of Philadelphia
Fitz Eugene Dixon, Jr. (1923-2006) - Former owner of Philadelphia 76ers, Phillies, Flyers and Wings
Morton Fetterolf, Jr. (1912-1997) - Pennsylvania State Representative and State Senator
Courtlandt Sherrington Gross (1904-1982) - Aviation pioneer and executive at Lockheed Martin Corporation
Lawrence Johnson (1801-1860) - printing stereotyper and type-founder

References

External links

 

Cemeteries in Montgomery County, Pennsylvania
Churches in Montgomery County, Pennsylvania
Episcopal churches in Pennsylvania
1698 establishments in Pennsylvania
Religious organizations established in 1698